Dolichopteryx andriashevi,  is a species of fish found known only from waters of the Phillipine Sea in the Pacific Ocean.

Size

Etymology
The fish is named in memory of the Russian ichthyologist Anatolii Petrovich Andriashev (1910–2009), who made a huge contribution to the study of fishes of the world's oceans.

References 

Opisthoproctidae
Fish of the Pacific Ocean
Taxa named by Nikolai Vasilyevich Parin
Taxa named by Tatyana Nikolaevna Belyanina
Taxa named by Sergei Afanasievich Evseenko
Fish described in 2009